Usona Esperantisto is the bi-monthly publication of Esperanto-USA, the organization for Esperanto speakers in the United States. Most of the content is in Esperanto, with the remainder in English. Topics include discussions of Esperanto culture, book reviews, short stories, and games.

First appearing in 1953, the magazine has changed names several times, from North American Esperanto Review to ELNA Newsletter to Esperanto USA. The name Usona Esperantisto was adopted in 2008. In 2012 the magazine became a web publication. The website features both current articles as well as a growing archive of back-issues.

See also
Amerika Esperantisto
List of Esperanto periodicals

References

External links
Website of Usona Esperantisto

Bimonthly magazines published in the United States
Cultural magazines published in the United States
Online magazines published in the United States
Bilingual magazines
Defunct magazines published in the United States
Esperanto in the United States
Esperanto magazines
Magazines established in 1953
Magazines disestablished in 2012
Magazines published in the San Francisco Bay Area
Newsletters
Online magazines with defunct print editions